The Paterson Building is a historic office building located at 653 South Saginaw Street and Third Street in Downtown Flint, Michigan. It was built by William A. Paterson of the W. A. Paterson Company who first built carriages starting in 1869. He switched to manufacturing automobiles in 1909, and the company built well-regarded automobiles until 1923. 

The building was damaged by fire and rebuilt in 1931 in the art deco style. The Paterson building has been owned by Thomas W. Collison Jr. of the Collison Family for 30 years under their parent corporation Thomas W. Collison & Co., Inc. It has three office floors with a full garage in the basement level.  The building consists of mainly law and medical offices. There are also retail stores on the Third Street side. The building rich Art Deco  has been maintained throughout the interior and exterior of the building.

References 

Buildings and structures in Flint, Michigan
Art Deco architecture in Michigan
Office buildings completed in 1931